Litsea granitica, the bollygum, is a species of tree in the laurel family, found in tropical Queensland. The habitat is mountain rainforest on soils derived from granite.

References

granitica
Flora of Queensland
Trees of Australia
Endemic flora of Australia
Taxa named by Bernard Hyland
Plants described in 1989